The 2005 Buffalo Funds - NAIA Division I men's basketball tournament was held from March 16 to 22 at Municipal Auditorium in Kansas City, Missouri. The sixty-eighth annual NAIA basketball tournament featured 32 teams playing in a single-elimination format. The 2005 National Champions were the unranked John Brown University who defeated the 9th ranked Azusa Pacific University by a score of 65 to 55. The other NAIA National semifinalists were Carroll College (MT) and Robert Morris College (IL).

2005 tournament would bring four new teams to the NAIA national semifinals. The first tournament since 2001 tournament to do so. (It would be the 7th time in tournament history this has happened; previous years were the inaugural year 1937, 1945, 1947, 1965, 1969, 2001).

Awards and honors
Leading scorer: Daniel Rose, Biola in 3 games Rose scored a total of 66 points, including 26 field goals and 14 free throws to average 22.0 points per game.
Leading rebounder: Mersad Terzic, Mountain State in 3 games Terzic earned 31 rebounds averaging 10.3 rebounds per game
Most consecutive tournament appearances: 14th, Georgetown (KY)
Most tournament appearances: Georgetown (KY), 24th of 28, appearances to the NAIA Tournament.

Bracket

  * denotes overtime.

See also
2005 NAIA Division I women's basketball tournament
2005 NCAA Division I men's basketball tournament
2005 NCAA Division II men's basketball tournament
2005 NCAA Division III men's basketball tournament
2005 NAIA Division II men's basketball tournament

References

NAIA Men's Basketball Championship
Tournament
NAIA Division I men's basketball tournament
NAIA Division I men's basketball tournament